Koba the Dread: Laughter and the Twenty Million is a 2002 non-fiction book by British writer Martin Amis.

Summary
The book is a study of the depredations of the regime of Joseph Stalin in the Soviet Union from the 1920s to the 1950s.

The title alludes to Stalin's nickname "Koba", and the estimated 20 million deaths in the Soviet Union during Stalin's rule owing to starvation, torture, gulags, and the purges and confessions of Stalin's Great Terror. The estimate of deaths under Stalin comes from Robert Conquest's work, a key source for Amis.

Reception
The book received a mixed reception. In The New York Times, critic Michiko Kakutani described the book as, "The narcissistic musings of a spoiled, upper-middle class litterateur who has never known the kind of real suffering Stalin's victims did." Publishers Weekly found that Amis  "relates passionately a story that needs to be told, the history of a regime that murdered its own people in order to build a better future for them."  Author Anne Applebaum, writing in Slate, claimed that "Koba the Dread is not, in fact, a competent account of Stalin's reign but rather a muddled misrendering of both Soviet and Western intellectual history." The Leningrad-born American writer Gary Shteyngart called Koba "harrowing and strangely funny" in The Washington Post, explaining, "'Koba the Dread' is not easy to forget. Along with the laughter it offers the reader unfamiliar with Stalin's legacy a number that is the first step in understanding Russia's modern tragedy. That number, once again, is twenty million." In The New York Times Book Review, writer and critic Paul Berman called the work "one of the oddest books about Stalin ever written, indignant, angry, personal and strangely touching...[Amis's] book carries a punch, artfully delivered—a punch that comes from looking at death and finding in it nothing but pain, cruelty, sadness, pointlessness and loss, a punch that comes from gazing at the indescribably horrific prison camps of the Soviet Union, or that comes from watching one's father and sister die." The book received scathing reviews in the UK. Historian Orlando Figes criticised Amis for, amongst other things, comparing the crying of his six-month daughter with the cries from Butyrki Prison in Moscow during the Great Terror.

Controversy
The book occasioned a public schism between Amis and fellow writer and close friend Christopher Hitchens, especially in the pages of The Atlantic. The break was later mended.

See also
 The Great Terror
 The Gulag Archipelago
 Robert Conquest

References

External links
 Christopher Hitchens on Koba the Dread
 Anne Applebaum writing for Slate on Amis and Hitchens: The Gulag Argumento
 The Sunday Times: Amis and Hitchens (paywalled)
 Michiko Kakutani on Koba the Dread

Books by Martin Amis
Books about Joseph Stalin
2002 non-fiction books